Seminoe Dam is a concrete thick-arch dam on the North Platte River in the U.S. state of Wyoming. The dam stores water for irrigation and hydroelectricity generation, and is owned and operated by the U.S. Bureau of Reclamation. It is the uppermost dam on the North Platte River and is located directly upstream from the Kortes Dam. The  dam forms Seminoe Reservoir, which covers more than  when full. Seminoe State Park is adjacent to the reservoir. The small village of Seminoe Dam abuts the dam and reservoir, and provides residence for the dam attendants and park services personnel.

History
This dam was first proposed in the 1930s as part of the Bureau of Reclamation's Kendrick Project, which would regulate the flow of the North Platte River in order to improve agriculture in the valleys surrounding Casper, Wyoming. Originally known as the Casper-Alcova Project, it was authorized by the National Industrial Recovery Act on June 16, 1933 in response to the Great Depression. The project was renamed the Kendrick Project on August 9, 1937 in honor of Wyoming politician John B. Kendrick.

In 1934, Winston Brothers Company and Associates won the construction contract of Seminoe Dam. Groundbreaking of the site was on February 20, 1936, with preliminary blasting and excavations. The diversion tunnel for the North Platte was completed on January 17, 1937, with one fatality, and by May of that year, a cofferdam was completed to a sufficient height to divert the river into the new channel. Concrete pouring began on January 19, 1938, and the last bucket was emptied on December 21, 1938. Water storage began on April 2, 1939, when the outlet tunnels were closed. The dam's power station was finished and the entire project was declared operational on August 3, 1939. A total of two deaths and several serious injuries resulted from the construction, and a pair of active faults that cut across the canyon near the dam site had to be excavated and filled in.

On March 25, 1969, a helicopter experienced engine problems and crashed into the rocky canyon near Seminoe dam killing Bureau of Reclamation employees David McMillan and Howard Leroy Gates. (Altoona Mirror, April 21, 1969)

A $2.5 billion 900 MW / 9 GWh (10-hour) pumped-storage hydroelectricity plant is scheduled to use Seminoe reservoir as the lower reservoir, and a new dam and reservoir as the upper.

Recreation
The Seminoe Reservoir is stocked with fish by the Wyoming Game and Fish Commission, and is open to boating and fishing, although access to the shoreline is limited and sometimes difficult due to the lack of development and distance from major cities.

See also
List of largest reservoirs of Wyoming

References

External links

Government page, reservoir level

Buildings and structures in Carbon County, Wyoming
Dams in Wyoming
United States Bureau of Reclamation dams
Dams completed in 1939
Dams on the North Platte River
Reservoirs in Wyoming
Hydroelectric power plants in Wyoming
1939 establishments in Wyoming